Yassine Ejjaki (born 15 May 1999) is a football player who plays for  club Mantova on loan from Reggina. Born in Italy, he represented Morocco internationally on junior level.

Club career
On 31 August 2021, Ejjaki joined Reggina in Serie B on loan, with a conditional obligation to buy.

He made his Serie B debut for Reggina on 18 April 2022 in a game against Lecce.

Reggina acquired his rights at the end of the loan. On 1 September 2022, Ejjaki was loaned by Reggina to Mantova.

References

External links
 

1999 births
Sportspeople from Cremona
Italian people of Moroccan descent
Living people
Moroccan footballers
Morocco youth international footballers
Morocco under-20 international footballers
Association football midfielders
Vis Pesaro dal 1898 players
Reggina 1914 players
Mantova 1911 players
Serie B players
Serie C players
Serie D players
Footballers from Lombardy